The Treaty of Karlowitz was signed in Karlowitz, Military Frontier of Archduchy of Austria (present-day Sremski Karlovci, Serbia), on 26 January 1699, concluding the Great Turkish War of 1683–1697 in which the Ottoman Empire was defeated by the Holy League at the Battle of Zenta. It marks the end of Ottoman control in much of Central Europe, with their first major territorial losses, beginning the reversal of four centuries of expansion (1299–1683), and established the Habsburg monarchy as the dominant power of the region.

Context and terms 
Following a two-month congress between the Ottoman Empire on one side and the Holy League of 1684, a coalition of the Holy Roman Empire, the Polish–Lithuanian Commonwealth, the Republic of Venice and Peter the Great, Tsar of Russia, a peace treaty was signed on 26 January 1699.

The Habsburgs received from the Ottomans the Eğri Eyalet, Varat Eyalet, much of the Budin Eyalet, the northern part of the Temeşvar Eyalet and parts of the Bosnia Eyalet. That corresponded to much of Hungary, Croatia and Slavonia. The Principality of Transylvania remained nominally independent but was subject to the direct rule of Austrian governors. Poland recovered Podolia, including the dismantled fortress at Kamaniçe. 

Venice obtained most of Dalmatia along with the Morea (the Peloponnese peninsula of southern Greece) though the Morea was restored to the Turks within 20 years by the Treaty of Passarowitz. There was no agreement about the Holy Sepulchre although it was discussed in Karlowitz.

The Ottomans retained Belgrade, the Banat of Temesvár (now Timișoara), as well as suzerainty over Wallachia and Moldavia. Negotiations with Tsardom of Russia for a further year under a truce agreed at Karlowitz culminated in the Treaty of Constantinople of 1700 in which the Sultan ceded the Azov region to Peter the Great. (Russia had to return the territories eleven years later after the failed Pruth River Campaign and the Treaty of the Pruth in 1711.)

Commissions were set up to devise the new borders between the Austrians and the Turks, with some parts disputed until 1703. Largely through the efforts of the Habsburg commissioner, Luigi Ferdinando Marsili, the Croatian and Bihać borders were agreed by mid-1700 and that at Temesvár by early 1701, leading to a border demarcated by physical landmarks for the first time.

It was later increased further in size by the acquisition of Polish territories in 1772 and 1795, by the annexation of Dalmatia in 1815, and by the annexation of Bosnia and Herzegovina in 1908.

The treaty was a watershed moment in the history of the Ottoman Empire, which for the first time lost substantial amounts of territory after three-and-a-half centuries of expansionism in Europe. Although the Ottoman borders in the region would wax and wane over the next 100 years, never again would there be any further acquisition of territory on a scale seen during the reigns of Mehmed the Conqueror, Selim the Grim, or Suleiman the Magnificent in the 15th-16th centuries. Indeed, after the mid-1700s the Ottoman frontier was largely delimited to the south of the Sava River and the Balkans proper, and would be further pushed south as the 19th century began.

Maps and images

Notes

References

Further reading

External links 

 Treaty of Karlowitz, Encyclopædia Britannica
 English text of treaty

Croatia under Habsburg rule
History of Dalmatia
Hungary under Habsburg rule
History of Syrmia
Karlowitz
Karlowitz
Sremski Karlovci
Karlowitz
Karlowitz
Karlowitz
Karlowitz
Karlowitz
1699 in the Holy Roman Empire
Karlowitz
1699 in the Ottoman Empire
Great Turkish War